Oksana Kovalevskaya is the lead singer of the Russian band Kraski ("Paints"), where she released five albums, each with a different color theme.

Career
In 2001, she released the single "Today I Went Home to Mother", and her first album You're an Adult. As part of their promotions outside of Belarus, she worked with Real Records to release her album in Russia. By then, she started using a color-based theme for her albums, and the name of her touring band was Kraski. Her debut album was thus released as the Yellow album – Big Brother. In 2002, she released her second single, "He doesn't know anything", which is about a bandit. After the tour concluded, she released her third single "I love you Joe". In January 2003, she released her fourth single, "My Mother", which is about a grown-up girl who wonder what's next.

Paints returned to the studio to record their second album, which uses the red color theme. Kovalevskaya released her third Kraski album with an orange color theme. In 2004, Kovalevskaya released her fourth Kraski album with a blue color theme. 

Her fifth album had a purple color theme. Its title track, "Those who love", was a duet with Russian pop singer Andrey Gubin. The album continued to show her mature side. Kraski expanded its 2005 tour to cities and countries they have not been to before. In 2005–2006 they traveled to England, Germany, the Netherlands, Austria, Hungary, Ireland and the United States. Kovalevskaya also lived in the United States for about a year, until she was pregnant with her second child.

In 2010, Kraski disbanded.

Discography
This is a list of her albums and prominent singles.

Studio albums
 Kraski
 Yellow album – Big Brother (originally released as Youre an Adult in 2001) (2002)
 Red album – I love you Sergey (2003)
 Orange album – Orange Sun (2003)
 Blue album – Spring (2004)
 Purple album – Those Who Love(2004)
 Solo
 Spring in the Heart (2013)

Singles
 Paints
 "Today I Arrived Home to Mom" (2001)
 "He Doesn't Know Anything" (2002)
 "Elder Brother" (2002)
 "My Mother" (2003)
 "I Love You, Sergey" (2003)
 "Orange Sun" (2003)
 "Just Fifteen Years" (2003)
 "Elder Brother part.2" (2004)
 "Spring" (2004)
 "Those Who Love" (with Andrey Gubin) (2004)
 "Boy" (2004)
 "Don't Say" (2004)
 "I'll Be Waiting" (2004)
 "Sea" (2005)
 "Boy with Postcards" (2006)
 "Late" (2007)
 Solo
 "You Are For Me" (2012)
 "Game Without Rules" (2012)
 "Leave" (2012)
 "I'm Running" (2012)
 "Race" (2012)
 "Happy New Year!" (2013)
 "Paradise" (2013)
 "Girl Wants" (2013)
 "You Ocean Of Light" (2013)
 "Spring in the Heart" (2013)
 "Loveless" (2013)
 "I'm Playing in Love" (2013)
 "About U" (2013)

References

External links
  – news posts and discography 
  – news posts and singles listings with remixes
  
  – contains 2012 announcement of lawsuit concerning ownership of Paints trademarks and songs.

21st-century Belarusian women singers
Living people
1983 births